27.5 mountain bikes, also called tweeners, are mountain bikes which use a large volume tire that is approximately 27.5 inches in diameter, 56 mm wide (ISO 56-584 / 27.5 x 2.25) on an ISO 584 mm rim. 

The wheel size is also known as "650B",
and is used as a "marketing term" by some manufacturers for their 27.5".
The 650B has traditionally been a designation for a 26 inch diameter (ISO ~ 40-584 demi-ballon tire) using the same ISO 584 mm rim used by French tandems, Porteurs and touring bicycles.

The 27.5 inch are seen as a compromise between the two existing standards of the original 26 inch (ISO 559 mm rim) and recently emerged 29 inch (ISO 622 mm rim) mountain bikes (late 2000s). They were pioneered by Kirk Pacenti in 2007, and as of 2013, at least 10 companies are launching models with 27.5 inch wheels, and parts manufacturers are following suit.

Nino Schurter won the World Cup event at Pietermaritzburg, South Africa, and placed second in the Olympics in 2012 on 27.5 inch wheels.

See also
 29er mountain bike
 Mountain bike
 Downhill bike
 Glossary of cycling
 Outline of cycling

References

External links
Nashbar AT2 Mountain Bike Review

Cycle types
Mountain biking